Kasija Miletić (ca. 1875–1915) was a prominent member of the Circle of Serbian Sisters and a volunteer nurse in World War I.

Biography
Kasija Đokić was born around 1875. Miletić was a socially-active young woman and with Delfa Ivanić became one of the founders of the Circle of Serbian Sisters. When the Great War broke out she went to the front as a volunteer nurse. While tending patients at the Valjevo Military Hospital, she contracted typhus. She died in the Valjevo Military Hospital in 1915.

References

Bibliography

External link
 

1875 births
1915 deaths
Serbian women in World War I
Serbian casualties of World War I
Female nurses in World War I
Circle of Serbian Sisters
Nurses killed in World War I